Hans Pieterman is a retired Dutch rower who won three medals at the World Lightweight Rowing Championships from 1974 to 1979 in the coxless four and coxed eight.

References

Living people
Dutch male rowers
World Rowing Championships medalists for the Netherlands
Year of birth missing (living people)
20th-century Dutch people
21st-century Dutch people